is a national park in Japan at the intersection of Saitama, Yamanashi, Nagano and Tokyo Prefectures.

With eight peaks over 2000 m scattered over 1250 km², there are numerous hiking trails and ancient shrines. The park has sources of major rivers such as the Arakawa River, Shinano River, Tama River, and Fuefuki River (Fuji River).

Popular areas

Tokyo Metropolis side 
The major points of interest are Mount Mitake, Mount Odakeand Mount Mito.

Mount Mitake is positioned on the eastern border of the national park.  It has been worshiped as a sacred mountain from the time of antiquity.  On its peak stands a Shinto shrine, which was established during the reign of Emperor Sujin in 90 B.C. The building houses a Zaōgonge Statue made in 736. At present, a cable-car service allows visitors easy access.

Mount Mito consists of three peaks: the Western Peak (1,527 m), Central Peak (1,531 m), and Eastern Peak (1,528 m).  The mountain is part of a northern section of the  that runs northeast from Mount Takao, Hachiōji, Tokyo.  The mountain is famous for its forest of Fagus japonica and was voted to be one of the best 100 mountains in Japan in 1997.  It is also the source of the Aki River, a major tributary of the Tama River.

Saitama Prefecture side 

The location of the Tochimoto Sekisho Historical Site sits at the junction of the Chichibu Trail that goes through the Karisaka Pass toward Kōshū and the Shinshū Route heading for Shinshū through the Jūmonji Pass.  Although the site at present is located in a small settlement on the mountains, at its heyday, many travelers went through this location.  The historic site offers a glimpse of that period when the path was frequented by travelers.

Nakatsu Canyon is a canyon that extends roughly 10 km and is carved by the Nakatsu River, a tributary of the Arakawa River. In particular, around in November many visitors are attracted to this location for fall foliage.

Yamanashi Prefecture side 

The Daibosatsu Pass is a pass that is famous from the novel The Sword of Doom by Kaizan Nakazato.  The pass resides between Kōshū, Yamanashi and Kosuge, Yamanashi and rises to 1897 m.  North of the pass along the ridge stands , 2,057 m in height above sea level.  The pass is sometimes called the “Hagiwara Road”, “Daibosatu Road”, or “Oume Way”.  Historically, it was used as an important but most strenuous leg of the Oume Route, an alternate route to Kōshū Kaidō, which connects Musashi Province and Kai Province.  In 1878, a renovation to the nearby Yanagisawa Pass shifted traffic away from the Daibosatsu Pass. In recent years, a mountain hut has been constructed.  The ridge provides magnificent vistas with a grass land with fireweed flowers.  Around May and October the site is visited by many hikers to see fireweed flowers and autumn foliage with the cable car extending to the Kamihikawa Pass.

The Mitake Shosēn Gorge is a gorge carved by a tributary of the Fuefuki River located on the northern side of the Kōfu Basin.  It is often shortened to the Shosēn Gorge.  Granite rocks curved into various shapes by the river embellish the gorge.  In 2008, the location was ranked in the best 100 waterways by the Ministry of the Environment.  The location is inhabited by a large population of birds.  Visitors started to come to the gorge through the Kōshū Kaidō during the Edo period. In 1964 and in 1972 opened Shosēn Gorge Ropeway and Mitake Shosēn Gorge Turnpike, respectively, making it a major tourist destination year around.  During the holidays seasons, traffic jam on the turnpike and difficulty with parking due to limited availability often take place.  In 1992, the Shosēnkyō Museum of Art, which mainly displays shadow play and kirigami exhibits, was built nearby.

The Nishisawa Canyon is a canyon carved by the Fuefuki River located upstream of Hirose Lake. It is situated at the northern part of Yamanashi Prefecture to the northeast of Hirose Lake, to the north of Mount Kurogane, to the east of Mt. Kokushi, Mt. Kita Okusenjō, and Mt. Okusenjō, and to the south of Mt. Tosaka and Mt. Kobushi. The entrance to the canyon is located along National Route 140. In the proximity a rest area, the Roadside Station Mitomi, and the Karisaka Tunnel. The canyon features falls and stream pools with a well-maintained trail. A portion of old railway tracks, Shirnrin Railway, is visible on the opposite side of the river.

Nagano Prefecture side 
Mount Kobushi is a mountain that sits between the border between Saitama Prefecture and Nagano Prefecture, rising to 2,475 m above sea level. The mountain is also known as the source of the Chikuma River, the Nagano Prefecture portion of the Shinano River.

Visitor centers 
There are three visitor centers.

Mitake Visitor Center 
The Mitake Visitor Center is located in Mitake village, half way between the top of the Mitake-Tozan Railway cable car and the Musashi-Mitake Shrine. It is located by following the left hand path named Maint Street from the cable car station.

Japanese and English guides and maps are available, as well as public restrooms. A small nature center is also located here.

Okutama Visitor Center

Yama-no-furusato Visitor Center

See also 
 List of national parks of Japan
 Okuchichibu Mountains

References

External links 

 Chichibu-Tama-Kai National Park

1950 establishments in Japan
National parks of Japan
Parks and gardens in Nagano Prefecture
Parks and gardens in Saitama Prefecture
Parks and gardens in Tokyo
Parks and gardens in Yamanashi Prefecture
Protected areas established in 1950